"What Are You Waiting For?" is a song by the Canadian rock band Nickelback from their eighth studio album, No Fixed Address, and released as the second overall single and lead pop single off the album. The song was released on September 5, 2014 to Australia and other various countries, before being shipped worldwide on September 9, 2014. The song impacted US Hot AC radio on September 22, 2014 and US CHR radio on October 21, 2014.

Music video
Nickelback announced that they were shooting the music video for the track, along with "Edge of a Revolution", on August 12, 2014 through their social media accounts. Though in an interview with Chad Kroeger on Hard Drive Radio, Chad announced that the music video was being delayed due to the band not agreeing on the storyline for the song. He also stated that the storyline has been reshot numerous times. To hold fans over, Nickelback released the audio video on September 11, 2014 and the lyric video for the song through their YouTube Vevo account on September 26, 2014.

Track listing

"What Are You Waiting For?"
"Edge of a Revolution"

Charts

Weekly charts

Year-end charts

Release history

References

2014 songs
2014 singles
Nickelback songs
Republic Records singles
Songs written by Ryan Peake
Songs written by Jacob Kasher
Songs written by Chad Kroeger
Music videos directed by Wayne Isham